Jiangyang District is the central urban district of the city of Luzhou, in the Sichuan province of China.

History
The district, as the main part of the old city, has a history of 2100 years. With the expansion of the city, the district became a county-level district of the greater Luzhou city in 1996.

Geography
The District has a total area of 649  km2.

Population
As of the 2020 census, Jiangyang District had a population of 761,576 inhabitants.

See also
Luzhou

References

External links
  Jiangyang District Government website

Districts of Sichuan
Luzhou